Holme East Waver  a civil parish in the Borough of Allerdale in Cumbria, England.  It contains six listed buildings that are recorded in the National Heritage List for England.  Of these, one is listed at Grade I, the highest of the three grades, and the others are at Grade II, the lowest grade.  The parish contains the villages and settlements of Newton Arlosh, Angerton, Moss Side, and Raby, and is otherwise rural.  The listed buildings consist of a fortified church, houses and farmhouses, and associated structures.


Key

Buildings

References

Citations

Sources

Lists of listed buildings in Cumbria